A Stoker, also known as The Stoker, is a 2010 Russian crime film directed by Aleksey Balabanov. The film takes place in St. Petersburg in the 1990s. Main character is a retired major who served in the Soviet Army during Soviet–Afghan War. He works as a stoker and disposes bodies of people killed by local Mafia, which is headed by one of his former comrades from the Soviet Army. Everything changes when he realizes that one of the bodies for disposal was his daughter.

Cast 
 Mikhail Skryabin as Stoker
 Yuriy Matveev as Vassily 'Bizon' - lover of Sasha and Masha
 Aleksandr Mosin as Sergeant - father of Masha
 Aida Tumutova as Sasha - daughter of Ivan Skryabin
 Anna Korotayeva as Masha - daughter of Sergeant
 Varvara Belokurova as Vera - daughter of Colonel Minayev
 Roman Burenkov as Gosha
 Filipp Dyachkov as Yasha
 Aleksandr Garkushenko as Kostya
 Kirill Komlev as Bartender

Synopsis 
Ivan Matveyevich Skryabin is an old Yakut stoker, A veteran of the Afghan war, who assists the local Mafia in disposing bodies of their targets. He has a daughter, who is dating a high ranking member of the same Mafia - Vassily "Bizon", a sniper, and intends to marry him. Vassily, unknowingly to Skryabin's daughter Sasha, is having an affair with Masha, the daughter of the Mafia's boss, the Sergeant Mikhail. In one of his missions, Vassily kills a highly secured target, but when he collects the money from the client, Feodor Alekseyevich, he wins an additional 30,000 Rubles from the client in a card game. Feodor, enraged, attempts to kill the Mafia boss Mikhail, but instead gets shot by Mikhail and dies. Skryabin and Mikhail dispose of the body together. Later, Masha, who is visiting Vassily, finds out about his affair with Sasha, and demands her father, the Mafia boss, to kill her. He agrees and commands Vassily to kill her, which he does without hesitation. When Vassily and Mikhail come to dispose of the body, Skryabin recognizes his daughter, but remains silent. Later, wearing his old military uniform, he goes to Mikhail's apartment and stabs him and Vassily to death, leaving Masha alive. He returns to his boiler room where he lives and works, and slits his wrists, committing suicide. At the end of the film, a short additional video plays, telling the story which Skryabin was writing in his free time at his boiler room - about a Russian outlaw ('Khaylak' in Yakut), Kostya, who was sent as punishment to Yakutia, where he abuses the Yakut family taking care of him, raping the wife and beating the husband.

Reception

Critical response
A Stoker has an approval rating of 100% on review aggregator website Rotten Tomatoes, based on 8 reviews, and an average rating of 7.40/10.

References

External links 
 

2010 films
2010s Russian-language films
Russian crime drama films
Films shot in Saint Petersburg
Russian films about revenge
Films set in the 1990s
2010 crime drama films
Films directed by Aleksei Balabanov